Cautatha is a genus of moths of the family Noctuidae. The genus was erected by George Hampson in 1910.

Species
Cautatha abyssinica Hacker, Fiebig & Stadie, 2019 Equatorial Guinea, Uganda, Ethiopia
Cautatha bifasciata Hacker, Fiebig & Stadie, 2019 Ethiopia
Cautatha coenogramma (Mabille, [1900]) Madagascar
Cautatha congoensis Hacker, 2019 Zaire
Cautatha crassilineata (Gaede, 1916) Cameroon
Cautatha drepanodes (Hampson, 1910) Cameroon, Gabon, Uganda, Angola, Zimbabwe, Ethiopia, Kenya, Tanzania
Cautatha drepanoidea Hacker, 2019 South Africa
Cautatha fontainei Hacker, 2019 Zaire
Cautatha macariodes (Hampson, 1910) Ghana, Cameroon, Central African Republic, Zaire, Gabon, Angola, Uganda, Tanzania
Cautatha megista Hacker, 2019 Ethiopia, Kenya, Tanzania, Uganda
Cautatha ozolica (Hampson, 1910) Ghana, Ivory Coast, Liberia, Kenya
Cautatha phoenicea Hampson, 1910 Ghana, Liberia, Ethiopia, Kenya, Uganda
Cautatha pyrrhochra Hacker, 2019 Zaire
Cautatha submacariodes (Berio, 1959) Madagascar
Cautatha tenuilineata (Gaede, 1916) Ivory Cost, Burkina Faso, Nigeria, Cameroon, Gabon, Kenya, Uganda, Rwanda, Tanzania

References

External links

Acontiinae